Marrit Jasper (born 28 February 1996) is a Dutch volleyball player for Volley-Ball Nantes and the Dutch national team.

She participated at the 2017 Women's European Volleyball Championship.

References

1996 births
Living people
Dutch expatriate sportspeople in Germany
Dutch women's volleyball players
Expatriate volleyball players in France
Expatriate volleyball players in Germany
Expatriate volleyball players in Italy
Outside hitters
People from Sneek
Sportspeople from Friesland